Malik Ibrar Ahmed (born 3 January 1970) is a Pakistani politician who had been a member of the National Assembly of Pakistan, from 2008 to May 2018. Previously, he has been a member of the Provincial Assembly of the Punjab from 2002 to 2007 .

Early life and education

He was born on 3 January 1970 in Rawalpindi.	

He earned a Bachelor of Arts degree from Government College Asghar Mall Rawalpindi in 1992.

Political career
He was elected to the Provincial Assembly of the Punjab as a candidate of Pakistan Muslim League (N) (PML-N) from Constituency PP-10 (Rawalpindi-X) in 2002 Pakistani general election. He received 17,035 votes and defeated a candidate of Pakistan Peoples Party (PPP).

He was elected to the National Assembly of Pakistan as a candidate of PML-N from Constituency NA-54 (Rawalpindi-V) in 2008 Pakistani general election. He received 58,228 votes and defeated a candidate of PPP. In the same election, he was re-elected to the Provincial Assembly of the Punjab as a candidate of PML-N from Constituency PP-10 (Rawalpindi-X). He received 35,532 votes and defeated Chaudhry Masood Akhtar, a candidate of PPP. He vacated the Punjab Assembly seat.

He was re-elected to the National Assembly as a candidate of PML-N from Constituency NA-54 (Rawalpindi-V) in 2013 Pakistani general election. He received 76,336 votes and defeated a candidate of Pakistan Tehreek-e-Insaf.

References

Living people
Pakistan Muslim League (N) politicians
Punjabi people
Pakistani MNAs 2013–2018
Politicians from Rawalpindi
1970 births
Pakistani MNAs 2008–2013
Punjab MPAs 2002–2007